The Pirates of the Caribbean PocketModel Game is the 10th expansion for the Pirates of the Spanish Main constructible strategy game released by WizKids.

History
Wizkids announced on July 23, 2007, its partnership with Disney, to create a Pirates set using content from all three Pirates of the Caribbean movies. It was scheduled for release in October 2007, but was delayed until November 6th. This set was the first release to use WizKids’ new PocketModel name to describe their constructible games. The expansion features ships and characters from all three films, and is completely compatible with all previous sets. Like most Pirates releases, each game pack includes two unassembled ships, one island/terrain card, a treasure or crew card, a rulebook and a miniature die, with an original MSRP of US$3.99. Wizkids also released collector tins, as with previous Pirates sets. The game was sold at hobby shops nationwide, as well as traditional retail stores such as Target and Wal-Mart.

New Features 
Krakens - Sea Monsters which have eight segments and can "wrap" around ships.
"Eternal" keyword - Eternal ships, when destroyed, appear back at the player's home island, essentially making them immortal.
Ship cards have a new, sturdier design. Masts have been redesigned with less cutouts and wider mast 'notches' to prevent snapping, cannon rank dice appear on both sides of a mast, the pennants for the center mast are gone, and there are some new faction flag designs.

References 

Wizkids Announces Disney's Pirates of the Caribbean PocketModel Game
Disney’s Pirates of the Caribbean PocketModel Game Compatible with All Pirates Releases!

Pirates of the Caribbean PocketModels